The East Nashville Crips, also known the Nashville Rollin' 90s Crips, are a division of the Los Angeles, California-based Rollin' 90s Crips. Their territory is in East Nashville, Nashville, Tennessee. The Rollin' 90s Crips set belongs to the original Crips gang founded in Los Angeles.

Origins 
The East Nashville Crips were founded by Jamal Shakir, a leader of the Rollin' 90s Crips in Los Angeles. Shakir brought with him a portion of the Los Angeles Rollin' 90s Crips members and established a set in East Nashville, in Nashville, Tennessee. While there is no certainty to the exact date of establishment for the East Nashville Crips, evidence of Los Angeles-based gang activity in the Nashville Metropolitan Area dates back to 1994, with the discovery of the body a former Los Angeles Parks employee, who became a drug-dealer, in Cheatham County.

Other Crips in Nashville 
While the Rollin' 90s Crips set is not the only known Crips set in Nashville with direct connection and cooperation with the Crips of Los Angeles, The Six, 98th Mafia, Five Deuce Hoover and Rollin 20s Rollin 40s Rollin (West 40 Crips), 60s Rollin 90s and 107 Ugc  are sets. These sets have come into existence well after the original founding of the East Nashville Crips and immigration of the Rollin' 90s Crips from Los Angeles.

Activity 
One of the earlier nationwide street-gangs to settle in Nashville, the East Nashville Crips maintained ties with the original Rollin' 90s Crips in Los Angeles, as Jamal Shakir used Nashville as a hub for his drug trafficking empire, which spanned nationwide and covered at least three other major cities (Los Angeles, California, Memphis, Tennessee, Oklahoma City, Oklahoma). In addition, the East Nashville Crips members have also been linked to or convicted of drug trafficking in the Nashville Area. Enforcer Donnell Young was sentenced to life in prison in 2009, yet the organization continues to grow. In 2010, two East Nashville Crips gang members were shot and killed at the J C Napier Homes in the Woodland in Waverly neighborhood across the river from Nashville's East End neighborhood. The MNPD speculates the growth of the East Nashville Crips/Rollin 90s Crips to have expanded to south Nashville, in the Antioch area, the North Nashville area (such as Buena Vista Heights), as well as the Madison area of Nashville.

References 

Organizations established in 1994
1994 establishments in Tennessee
Crips subgroups
African-American history in Nashville, Tennessee
Organizations based in Nashville, Tennessee